Otto Jemelka (1914 – 16 March 2008) was a Czechoslovakian modern pentathlete. He competed at the 1948 Summer Olympics.

References

1914 births
2008 deaths
Czechoslovak male modern pentathletes
Olympic modern pentathletes of Czechoslovakia
Modern pentathletes at the 1948 Summer Olympics